Miss Havisham's Fire is an opera in 2 acts by composer Dominick Argento with an English language libretto by John Olon-Scrymgeour. The work is loosely based on Charles Dickens' 1861 novel Great Expectations, and centers on an investigation of the circumstances surrounding the death of Aurelia Havisham. Commissioned by the New York City Opera, the work premiered on March 22, 1979, at the New York State Theater at the Lincoln Center for the Performing Arts in Manhattan.

Miss Havisham's Fire was initially intended to be a farewell vehicle for soprano Beverly Sills, but she pulled out of the project due to illness and was replaced by Rita Shane. The opera received negative to mixed reviews in the press at its premiere and was not mounted again for more than 20 years. Argento revised it into a one-act monodrama entitled Miss Havisham's Wedding Night which Minnesota Opera premiered on May 1, 1981, at the Tyrone Guthrie Theater in Minneapolis, conducted by Philip Brunelle. It was performed under the baton of Gil Rose at Carnegie Hall on November 9, 2017, in a concert by New York City Opera celebrating the composer's 90th birthday.

In 2001 the Opera Theatre of Saint Louis revived the work in a new version by Argento that shortened the opera by more than an hour and made improvements to the work's dramatic structure. This production received a much more positive response from the press.

Roles

References

External links
Miss Havisham's Fire, (1979, rev. 1996), Boosey & Hawkes

Operas by Dominick Argento
1979 operas
English-language operas
Operas
Operas based on novels
Opera world premieres at New York City Opera
Works based on Great Expectations